The Long Ballad (Chinese: 长歌行), also known as Chang Ge Xing, is a 2021 Chinese historical series based on the 2011 manhua of the same name by Xia Da. It is directed by Zhu Ruibin and stars Dilraba Dilmurat, Leo Wu, Zhao Lusi and Liu Yuning. Set against the backdrop of the Tang dynasty, during the reigns of Emperor Gaozu and Emperor Taizong, the drama tells the story of an imperial princess who seeks revenge for her family, and in doing so, her fate interwines with that of a tribal prince. Although it features many real historical figures, most of the relationship between the characters and plotlines are fictional.
Chinese American Film Festival 2021 Golden Angel Award for Dilraba Dilmurat (Li Changge)
Golden Angel Award for Outstanding Television Series "The Long Ballad"

Plot 
The story takes place in the political center of Chang'an in the year 626 C.E of the Tang Dyanasty, revolving around Li Changge, the daughter of Li Jiancheng, the Crown Prince of Tang.

However, her peaceful life turns upside down after her family was brutally murdered during the Xuanwu Gate Incident, a coup d'état instigated by her uncle, who is known afterwards as Emperor Taizong. Traumatized by the sudden loss of her family and the betrayal of her uncle, Li Changge's anguish evolves into a burning intent for vengeance. 

With her mind firmly fixed on revenge, she sets off on a journey to overthrow Taizong. Along her way, she unexpectedly meets Ashile Sun, who is later revealed to be the valiant general of the Eastern Turkic Khaganate and Tegin of the Eagle Division. Through countless events, their fates become increasingly intertwined, and together they soon discover the forces working behind the scenes that could jeopardise the safety and peace of everything they love.

Cast

Main

 Dilraba Dilmurat as Li Changge, Princess of Yongning
 Historical prototype: Princess of Dingxiang County (定襄县主)
Daughter of the Crown Prince of Tang. Proficient in martial arts and military strategy. She seeks to avenge her parents who were killed by her second uncle, Li Shimin.
Leo Wu as Ashile Sun, Tegin of the Eagle Division
 Historical prototype: Ashina Zhong (阿史那忠)
Adopted son of Yanli Qaghan. A skilled warrior and strategist who is embroiled in rivalry for the throne.
Liu Yuning as Hao Du
 Historical prototype: Du He (杜荷)
Du Ruhui's cold-blooded and loyal foster son who works for Li Shimin.
Zhao Lusi as Li Leyan, Princess Yongan
 Historical prototype: Princess Chengyang (城阳公主)
Li Shimin's daughter. A shy but independent princess. She is Li Changge's cousin and closest friend.
Fang Yilun as Wei Shuyu
A Tang official and the son of Wei Zheng. He grew up with Li Changge and Li Leyan.

Supporting

Tang
Geng Le as Li Shimin, Emperor Taizong of Tang
Li Changge's beloved second uncle who betrayed her trust.
Oscar He Yuxiao as Li Chengqian, Crown Prince of Tang
Li Shimin's troublemaking eldest son. Leyan's younger brother and Changge's cousin.
Liu Jin Long as Li Jiancheng
Changge's father. Older brother of Li Shimin.
Xu Rong Zhen as Lady Jin
Changge's mother.
Cheng Taishen as Du Ruhui
A Tang official and Li Shimin's loyal supporter. Hao Du's foster father.
Tan Jianchang as Wei Zheng
Li Jiancheng's advisor, who later becomes Li Shimin's official.
Nicholas Wang as General Wang Jun Kuo
Yang Zi Hua as Fang Xuanling
A chancellor under Li Shimin. Li Changge’s teacher.
Tian Yu Peng as Li Jing (Tang dynasty)
General Li Jing, Duke Wei. Du Ruhui tries to convince him to take over the Ministry of War.
Mei Ling Zhen as Hong Fu Nu, Hongfu
Li Jing's wife
Kong Qi Li as Li Chunfeng
Imperial astronomer
Dong Li Wu You as Sheng Xin
 Li Chengqian's servant.

Ashile 
 Jin Song as Ashile Chuobi, Yanli Qaghan
 Ruler of the Ashile Tribe and Sun's foster father. The uncle and stepfather of Ashile She'er.
Yang Mingna as Princess Yicheng, Khatun of the Ashile Tribe
A princess from the Sui dynasty. The mother of Ashile She'er and Yanli Qaghan's wife.
Kudousi Jiang Ainiwaer as Ashile She'er, Young Khan of the Ashile Tribe
The only child of Princess Yicheng. Nephew of Qaghan. Ashile Sun's biggest rival and foster brother. Leader of the Wolf Division.
Lu Yan Bei as Madame Jin Se
Ashile Chuobi's concubine. Princess Yicheng's right hand woman. Granddaughter of a Sui Dynasty duke plotting against the Tang Dynasty. 
Zhu Li Qun as A Yi Er
Ashile Sun's foster mother. 
Yi Daqian as Mu Jin
Ashile Sun's childhood friend and trusted general.
Jiang Xiao Lin as Su Yi She
Ashile Sun's trusted general.
Zhang Hao Zhe as Ya Luo
Ashile Sun's trusted general.
Cao Xiyue as Mimi Guli
A slave who was saved by Li Changge and became her close friend. The childhood playmate of Ashile She'er.

People around Changge
Feng Junjie as A'Dou
 Li Changge's apprentice whose dream is to become a general.
Lu Xingyu as Gongsun Heng
The Governor of Shuozhou.
Wang Jing Yan as Madame Gongsun
Gongsun Heng's wife.
Li Jian Yi as Qin Lao
Gongsun Heng's butler.
Wu Cheng Xu as Xu Feng
Gongsun Heng's bodyguard.
 Liu Chuxuan as Luo Shiba
 General Luo's last warrior who later serves Li Changge.
Liu Haikuan as Situ Langlang
Li Changge's martial arts teacher. Only descendant of Yue Nu Sword. Wanders freely with Sun Simiao.
Li Guangfu as Sun Simiao
 A Taoist physician renowned for his medical knowledge and skills.
Sa Dingding as Lady Jingdan
Leader of the Luiyin Taoist Temple in Luoyang.

Others
Zhou Aoyun as Buzhen
 Mimi Guli's younger brother and the companion of the King of Sui.

Production

The Long Ballad is based on Xia Da's comic Chang Ge Xing, which was published from 2011 to 2016.  The comic has received numerous awards such as the Golden Dragon Award for Best Girls' comic and the Newcomer Award at the first Sino-Japanese Youth Exchange Cartoon Festival.

Soundtrack

Awards and nominations

Chinese American Film Festival 2021 Golden Angel Award for Dilraba Dilmurat (Li Changge)
Golden Angel Award for Outstanding Television Series "The Long Ballad"

Seoul International Drama Awards 2021, Dilraba Dilmurat Best Actress Nomination, Individual Category (Li Changge)

International broadcast 
The Long Ballad is available for streaming on Netflix, YouTube and Viu with English & Turkish subtitles (only on YouTube).

Reception 
The Long Ballad is very well received by both at home and overseas. According to the distributors of the series, it scored 9.4 points out of 10 on the popular streaming site Viki, propelling it to the top of the charts for new Chinese series during its premiere week. Additionally, the first 20 episodes of the series has accumulated over 20 million views online as of April 6, 2021, just a little over three weeks of its airing.

References

Television shows based on Chinese novels
2020 Chinese television series debuts